Panama Lady is a 1939 film starring Lucille Ball.

Plot 
Panama Lady is a cleaned-up remake of the 1932 Helen Twelvetrees film vehicle Panama Flo. Lucille Ball essays the old Twelvetrees role as Lucy, a nightclub "hostess" stranded in Panama by her ex-lover Roy (Donald Briggs).

Victimized by a shakedown orchestrated by tavern owner Lenore, oil rigger McTeague (Allan Lane) holds Lucy responsible. To avoid landing in jail, Lucy agrees to accompany McTeague to his oil camp as his housekeeper. Assuming that she has been brought to this godforsaken spot strictly for illicit purposes, Lucy eventually realizes that McTeague's intentions are honorable: All he wants is his money back, and he expects our heroine to work off the debt on her feet.

Ultimately, Lucy and McTeague fall in love, but not before the scurrilous Roy re-enters her life.

Cast
 Lucille Ball as Lucy
 Allan Lane as McTeague
 Steffi Duna as Cheema
 Donald Briggs as Roy Harmon
 Evelyn Brent as Lenore
 Bernadene Hayes as Pearl

References

External links 
  
 
 New York Times Review [broken link, Oct 8, 2021]

1939 films
1939 romantic drama films
American romantic drama films
American black-and-white films
Films produced by Cliff Reid
Films directed by Jack Hively
RKO Pictures films
1930s English-language films
Films with screenplays by Garrett Fort
Films set in Panama
Domestic workers in films
1930s American films